Black Pumas is the debut album by American band Black Pumas. It was released on June 21, 2019, through ATO Records. The deluxe edition was nominated for Album of the Year at the 63rd Annual Grammy Awards on November 24, 2020, while "Colors" received two nominations for Record of the Year and Best American Roots Performance.

The album reached its peak of number 86 on the US Billboard 200 with 10,000 album equivalent units.

Track listing

Personnel

Black Pumas
 Eric Burton – vocals, guitar.
 Adrian Quesada – guitar, producer, engineering, mixing

Additional personnel
 Stephen Bidwell – drums
 Josh Blue – drums, guitar
 Brendan Bond – bass guitar
 Art Brown – tenor saxophone
 Alexis Buffum – violin
 Lauren Cervantes – backing vocals
 Elijah Clark – trombone
 Scott Davis – bass, keyboards
 Jay B. Flatt – string arrangements
 Spencer Garland – keyboards
 JJ Johnson – drums
 Josh Levy – baritone saxophone
 Angela Miller – backing vocals
 Scott Morning	– trumpet
 Trevor Nealon	– keyboards
 Derek Phelps – trumpet
 Adrienne Short – violin
 JaRon Marshall - keyboards
 John Speice – bass guitar, drums
 Jenavieve Varga – violin
 Ulrican Williams – trombone

Production
 Jon Kaplan – producer
 Jacob Sciba – engineering, mixing
 Stuart Sikes – engineering, mixing
 Erik Wofford – engineering, mixing
 JJ Golden – mastering engineer

Charts

References

2019 debut albums
Black Pumas albums